Qars (also, Kars) is a former village in the Khizi Rayon of Azerbaijan. The village formed part of the municipality of Tıxlı.

References 

Populated places in Khizi District